Wellingtonia can mean:

A genus of plants in the family Sabiaceae, usually treated as a synonym of the genus Meliosma.
A vernacular name for the coniferous tree Sequoiadendron giganteum.
Wellingtonia (horse) was a thoroughbred racehorse in the late 19th century.